Taihe is a town under the administration of Linshui County, Sichuan, China. , it administers the following three residential neighborhoods and seven villages:
Neighborhoods
Luokuangba Community
Puxin Community
Xinzhen Community

Villages
Huluba Village
Liujia'an Village
Yangtiangou Village
Qinggangping Village
Gaojiamiao Village
Jinpan Village
Tianpo Village

References 

Township-level divisions of Sichuan
Linshui County